Rain Dogs is the ninth studio album by American singer-songwriter Tom Waits, released in September 1985 on Island Records. A loose concept album about "the urban dispossessed" of New York City, Rain Dogs is generally considered the middle album of a trilogy that includes Swordfishtrombones and Franks Wild Years.

The album, which includes appearances by guitarists Keith Richards and Marc Ribot, is noted for its broad spectrum of musical styles and genres, described by Arion Berger in a 2002 review in Rolling Stone as merging "outsider influences – socialist decadence by way of Kurt Weill, pre-rock integrity from old dirty blues, the elegiac melancholy of New Orleans funeral – into a singularly idiosyncratic American style."

The album peaked at number 29 on the UK charts and number 188 on the US Billboard Top 200. In 1989, it was ranked number 21 on the Rolling Stone list of the "100 greatest albums of the 1980s." In 2012, the album was ranked number 399 on the magazine's list of "The 500 Greatest Albums of All Time", and at number 357 in 2020.

Composition and recording
Waits wrote the majority of the album in a two-month stint in the fall of 1984 in a basement room at the corner of Washington and Horatio Streets in Manhattan. According to Waits, it was, "kind of a rough area, Lower Manhattan between Canal and 14th Street, just about a block from the river ... It was a good place for me to work. Very quiet, except for the water coming through the pipes every now and then. Sort of like being in a vault."

In preparation for the album, Waits recorded street sounds and other ambient noises on a cassette recorder to get the sound of the city that would be the album's subject matter.

A wide range of instruments was employed to achieve the album's sound, including marimba, accordion, double bass, trombone, and banjo. The album is notable for its organic sound, and the natural means by which it was achieved. Waits, discussing his mistrust of then fashionable studio techniques, said, "If I want a sound, I usually feel better if I've chased it and killed it, skinned it and cooked it. Most things you can get with a button nowadays. So if I was trying for a certain drum sound, my engineer would say, 'Oh, for Christ's sake, why are we wasting our time? Let's just hit this little cup with a stick here, sample something (take a drum sound from another record) and make it bigger in the mix, don't worry about it.' I'd say, 'No, I would rather go in the bathroom and hit the door with a piece of two-by-four very hard.

Waits also stated that "if we couldn't get the right sound out of the drum set we'd get a chest of drawers in the bathroom and bang it real hard with a two-by-four," such that "the sounds become your own."

Rain Dogs was the first time that Waits worked with guitarist Marc Ribot, who was impressed by Waits' unusual studio presence. Ribot said, "Rain Dogs was my first major label type recording, and I thought everybody made records the way Tom makes records. ... I've learned since that it's a very original and individual way of producing. As producer apart from himself as writer and singer and guitar player he brings in his ideas, but he's very open to sounds that suddenly and accidentally occur in the studio. I remember one verbal instruction being, 'Play it like a midget's bar mitzvah. Ribot also recalls how the band would not rehearse the songs before going to record; rather, Waits would play them the songs on an acoustic guitar in the studio. "He had this ratty old hollow body, and he would spell out the grooves. It wasn't a mechanical kind of recording at all. He has a very individual guitar style he sort of slaps the strings with his thumb ... He let me do what I heard, there was a lot of freedom. If it wasn't going in a direction he liked, he'd make suggestions. But there's damn few ideas I've had which haven't happened on the first or second take."

The album marks the first time Waits recorded with guitarist Keith Richards of the Rolling Stones. Waits said, "There was something in there that I thought he would understand. I picked out a couple of songs that I thought he would understand and he did. He's got a great voice and he's just a great spirit in the studio. He's very spontaneous, he moves like some kind of animal. I was trying to explain 'Big Black Mariah' and finally I started to move in a certain way and he said, 'Oh, why didn't you do that to begin with? Now I know what you're talking about.' It's like animal instinct."

According to Barney Hoskyns, the album's general theme of "the urban dispossessed" was inspired in part by Martin Bell's 1984 documentary Streetwise, to which Waits had been asked to contribute music.

Artwork
Though it has been remarked that the man on the cover bears a striking resemblance to Waits, the photograph is actually one of a series taken by the Swedish photographer Anders Petersen at Café Lehmitz (a café near the Hamburg red-light boulevard Reeperbahn) in the late 1960s. The man and woman depicted on the cover are called Rose and Lilly.

Critical reception

The album has been noted as one of the most important musically and critically in Waits' career, in particular to the new direction which he undertook from 1983's Swordfishtrombones onwards. AllMusic critic William Ruhlmann wrote, "Rain Dogs can't surprise as Swordfishtrombones had." Nevertheless, Ruhlman further commented that "much of the music matches the earlier album, and there is so much of it that that is enough to qualify Rain Dogs as one of Waits' better albums." Robert Christgau of The Village Voice stated that Waits "worked out a unique and identifiable lounge-lizard sound that suits his status as the poet of America's non-nine-to-fivers."

In his 1985 review for Rolling Stone, Anthony DeCurtis gave the album a mixed review, writing: "Rain Dogs insists on nosing its way around the barrooms and back alleys Waits has so often visited before." However, in a more recent review in 2002, Rolling Stone critic Arion Berger praised the album, describing the music as "bony and menacingly beautiful." Berger also observed that "it's quirky near-pop, the all-pro instrumentation pushing Waits' not-so-melodic but surprisingly flexible vocals out front, where his own peculiar freak flag, his big heart and his romantic optimism gloriously fly."

At year's end, Rain Dogs was ranked number 1 among the "Albums of the Year" for 1985 by NME. In later assessments, Pitchfork listed Rain Dogs as 8th best album of the 1980s, and Slant Magazine listed the album at number 14 on its list of "Best Albums of the 1980s". Rolling Stone listed it as number 21 on its list of "100 Best Albums of the Eighties," as well as listing the album at 399 and 357 in its 2012 and 2020 updates respectively of The 500 Greatest Albums of All Time. The album was also included in the book 1001 Albums You Must Hear Before You Die.

In 2000 it was voted number 299 in Colin Larkin's All Time Top 1000 Albums.

Track listing
All songs written and composed by Tom Waits except where noted.

Side one

Side two

Personnel
All personnel credits adapted from the album's liner notes.

Performer
Tom Waits – vocals (1–10, 12–17, 19), guitar (2, 4, 6, 8–10, 15–17), organ (3, 19), piano (5, 12), harmonium (8, 18), banjo (13)

Musicians
Michael Blair – percussion (1–4, 7, 8, 12, 13, 17), marimba (2, 7, 10, 12), drums (8, 14, 18), congas (4), bowed saw (12), parade drum (19)
Stephen Hodges – drums (1, 2, 4, 6, 10, 11, 15, 16), parade drum (3)
Larry Taylor – double bass (1, 3, 4, 6, 8–10, 15), bass (7, 11, 14, 16)
Marc Ribot – guitar (1–4, 7, 8, 10)
"Hollywood" Paul Litteral – trumpet (1, 11, 19)
Bobby Previte – percussion (2), marimba (2)
William Schimmel – accordion (3, 9, 10)
Bob Funk – trombone (1, 3, 5, 10, 11, 19)
Ralph Carney – baritone saxophone (4, 14), saxophone (11, 18), clarinet (12)
Greg Cohen – double bass (5, 12, 13)
Chris Spedding – guitar (1)
Tony Garnier – double bass (2)
Keith Richards – guitar (6, 14, 15), backing vocals (15)
Robert Musso – banjo (7)
Arno Hecht – tenor saxophone (11, 19)

Musicians (continued)
Crispin Cioe – saxophone (11, 19)
Robert Quine – guitar (15, 17)
Ross Levinson – violin (15)
John Lurie – alto saxophone (16)
G.E. Smith – guitar (17)
Mickey Curry – drums (17)
Tony Levin – bass (17)
Robbie Kilgore – organ (17)

Technical personnel
Tom Waits – record producer
Robert Musso – engineer, mixing (1–16, 18, 19)
Tom Gonzales – recording
Dennis Ferrante – recording
Jeff Lippay – recording, mixing (17)
Howie Weinberg – mastering

Design personnel
Peter Corriston – art direction
Anders Petersen – photography (front cover)
Robert Frank – photography (back cover)

Chart positions

Certifications

References
Bibliography
 Hoskyns, Barney (2009). Lowside of the Road. (London: Faber and Faber)

External links

Tom Waits albums
1985 albums
Island Records albums